Elections to Liverpool City Council were held on Thursday 12 May 1949.

After the election, the composition of the council was:

Election result

Ward results

* - Councillor seeking re-election

This was the first May local election following the move from November. Councillors standing for re-election at this election were previously elected in 1945. Therefore, comparisons are made with the 1945 election results.

Abercromby

Aigburth

Allerton

Anfield

Breckfield

Brunswick

Castle Street

Childwall

Croxteth

Dingle

Edge Hill

Everton

Exchange

Fairfield

Fazakerley

Garston

Granby

Great George

Kensington

Kirkdale

Little Woolton

Low Hill

Much Woolton

Netherfield

North Scotland

Old Swan

Prince's Park

Sandhills

St. Anne's

St. Domingo

St. Peter's

Sefton Park East

Sefton Park West

South Scotland

Vauxhall

Walton

Warbreck

Wavertree

Wavertree West

West Derby

Aldermanic elections

Aldermanic elections 23 May 1949

At the meeting of the City Council on 23 May 1949 the terms of office of twenty of the forty Aldermen expired and the Council elected twenty Aldermen to fill the vacant positions for a term of six years.

 * Reelected Aldermen

By-elections

Childwall, 15 September 1949

Caused by the election of Cllr. William John Matthew Clark as an Alderman on 23 May 1949

Anfield 10 November 1949

Caused by the death of Cllr. Aled Owen Roberts

Alderman William Albert Robinson died on 31 December 1949
His position was filled by Cllr. Michael John Reppion (Labour, elected for the South Scotland ward in May 1949), who was elected as an Alderman by the Council on 1 February 1950 and was assigned as the Returning Officer for the Everton ward.

Alderman Peter Kavanagh died on 19 February 1950
His position was filled by Cllr. Stanley Robert Williams (Conservative, elected for the Wavertree ward on 1 November 1947), who was elected as an Alderman by the City Council on 5 April 1950 and assigned as Returning Officer for the Vauxhall ward.

Alderman Gertrude Elizabeth Wilson died on 23 February 1950.

Her position was filled by Cllr. George Webster Green Armour (Conservative, elected for the Sefton Park East ward in November 1946) was elected as an Alderman by the City Council on 5 April 1950 and assigned as Returning Officer for the Dingle ward.

References

1949
1949 English local elections
1940s in Liverpool
May 1949 events in the United Kingdom